ZTE Racer II (also known as ZTE Meteor Racer II or zte p728b) is a phone manufactured by China's ZTE Corporation for the Android platform. It went on sale in September 2011.

Turkcell T11 is a rebranded version of ZTE P728T, one of variations of ZTE Racer II.

See also 
 Galaxy Nexus
 List of Android devices

References

External links 
 http://www.gsmarena.com/zte_racer_ii-4290.php

Android (operating system) devices
Racer II
Discontinued smartphones